This is a list of monuments and sites that are classified or inventoried by the Moroccan ministry of culture around Zagora.

Monuments and sites in Zagora 

|}

References 

Zagora
Zagora Province